Richfield is a census-designated place (CDP) in Sarpy County, Nebraska, United States.

History
A post office was established at Richfield in 1890, and remained in operation until being discontinued in 1998. Richfield was named for the fertility of the surrounding farmland.

Geography

Demographics
As of the census of 2010, there were 43 people living in the CDP. The population density was 10.99 inhabitants/ km. Of the 43 inhabitants, Richfield was composed of 95.35% white, 0% were African-American, 0% were Native American, 0% were Asian, 0% were Pacific Islanders, 0% were from other races and 4.65% belonged to two or more races. Of the total population, 0% were Hispanic or Latino of any race.

References

Census-designated places in Sarpy County, Nebraska
Census-designated places in Nebraska